"You Can Have It All" is a song by the Kaiser Chiefs, originally included on their debut album, Employment. The song has a mellow, slow-paced mood - the lyrics suggest an on/off relationship with a woman. "You Can Have it All" is largely influenced by The Beach Boys, partially evident due to its use of vocal harmony.

At Christmas time, a "light orchestral" version of the song was released exclusively on the Kaiser Chiefs' website as a 7" vinyl record. The record was restricted to 2,000 copies. The record comes in a gatefold cover which inside includes a special Christmas message from the band and their respective autographs. There is also a rare promo-CD issuing of this release .

7" track listing 

 "You Can Have it All" (Light Orchestral)
 "I Predict Some Quiet" (Silent track)

2004 songs
Kaiser Chiefs songs
Songs written by Ricky Wilson (British musician)
Songs written by Andrew White (musician)
Songs written by Simon Rix
Songs written by Nick "Peanut" Baines
Songs written by Nick Hodgson